The WOW World Tag Team Championship is a women's professional wrestling tag team championship created and promoted by the American professional wrestling promotion Women of Wrestling (WOW). Miami's Sweet Heat (Laurie Carlson and Lindsey Carlson) are the current champions in the second reign.

History 
On January 20, 2001, Caged Heat (Delta Lotta Pain and Loca) Harley's Angels (Charlie Davidson and EZ Rider) in the end of 16-teams tournament to become the inaugural champions. Through the tapings of the revived WOW in 2013, Caged Heat returned as champions, but quickly lost the title to The All American Girls (Amber O'Neal and Santana Garrett).

On May 16, 2019, Adrenaline and Fire defeated Monsters of Madness (Hazard and Jessicka Havok) in the finals of a 16-teams tournament to win the vacant title.

On May 2, 2022, the titles appeared to be vacant again. Miami's Sweet Heat (Laurie Carlson and Lindsey Carlson) defeated The Tonga Twins (Kaoz and Kona) in the tournament finals to win the vacant title.

Inaugural tournament (season 1) 2000–2001

Vacant tag team championship tournament match (season 4) 2016

Vacant tag team championship tournament match (season 6) 2019

Vacant tag team championship tournament match (season 8) 2022

Reigns 
Caged Heat (Delta Lotta Pain and Loca) were the inaugural champions. The All American Girls (Amber O'Neal and Santana Garrett) has the longest reign at 1,349 days, while Caged Heat's second reign was the shortest which lasted less than a day. Caged Heat has the most reigns as team at two.

Miami's Sweet Heat (Laurie Carlson and Lindsey Carlson) are the current champions in their first reign. They defeated The Tonga Twins (Kaoz and Kona) in the tournament finals to win the vacant championship on September 21, 2022, in Los Angeles, CA, which aired on tape delay on December 10.

Combined reigns 

By team

By wrestler

References

External links 
 WOW World Tag Team Championship at Cagematch.net

Women's professional wrestling tag team championships